Vishwa is a 1999 Indian Kannada-language action drama film directed by Shivamani and produced by Gurubabu. The film stars Shiva Rajkumar, Ananth Nag, Suhasini Maniratnam and Suchitra Krishnamurthy. It is a remake of Rajkumar Santoshi's Hindi film Ghayal (1990). The film also had its Tamil version released in 1992 as Bharathan starring Vijaykanth and Bhanupriya and a Telugu version Gamyam starring Srikanth released in 1998.

Cast 
 Shiva Rajkumar as Vishwa
 Ananth Nag as Vijay
 Suchitra Krishnamurthy as Usha
 Suhasini Maniratnam as Indu (Vijay's Wife)
 Thiagarajan as Special Commissioner D'Souza
 Srinivasa Murthy as Barristor Girish Rao
 Satya Prakash as Mahatma Guttedar, Drug smuggler
 Mimicry Dayanand as Boxing coach 
 Lohithaswa as Police Commissioner Joshi
 Sathyajith as Inspector Syed
Gayathri prabhakar
Shivaram 
Madhusudhan Rao as Dragger alias Madhusudhan Reddy, A gangster 
S. V. Prasad as RK alias Radhakrishnan 
Kote prabhakar as kote, gangster 
Manjunath Hegde 
Neegro Johnny 
Killer venkatesh

Soundtrack 
The soundtrack of the film was composed by Hamsalekha who also wrote the lyrics for the songs.

References

External links 
 Movie portal
 

1999 films
1990s Kannada-language films
Indian action films
Kannada remakes of Hindi films
Films scored by Hamsalekha
1999 action films